Ralph Schon (born 20 January 1990) is a Luxembourger international footballer who plays club football for FC Wiltz 71, as a goalkeeper.

Career
Schon has also played club football for FF Norden 02 and FC UNA Strassen.

He made his international debut for Luxembourg in 2016 in a 3:1 away loss to the Netherlands  in a 2018 FIFA World Cup qualification match.

References

1990 births
Living people
Luxembourgian footballers
Luxembourg international footballers
Association football goalkeepers
FC Wiltz 71 players